

Events
1 January – Australia Live, a four-hour celebration welcoming a year of celebrations for Australia's bicentennial of European settlement airs on the ABC, SBS, the Nine Network and regional solus stations. It's also aired in the U.S. on A&E.
2 January – Imparja starts broadcasting to remote Central Australia via satellite It would have its official launch on 15 January.
17 January – The first episode of Home and Away one of the longest running Australian TV soaps since Neighbours airs on Seven Network
24 January – Ten launches Richmond Hill, a Grundy Organisation production, created by Reg Watson. Billed as a sister-soap to Neighbours, it airs on Wednesdays and Thursdays at 19:30-20:30.
January – Five months after Countdown'''s demise, Molly Meldrum returns to television and joins Nine's Hey Hey It's Saturday as part of the weekly Molly's Melodrama segment.
18 January – A Current Affair launches on the Nine Network after a ten-year absence, hosted by Jana Wendt.
24 January – Network Ten unveils new logo, the "X" logo.
February – Seven Network launches Family Feud.
8 February – Canadian teen drama series Degrassi Junior High, the second in the Degrassi trilogy series debuts on the ABC.
16 February – The Comedy Company starring Mark Mitchell (Con The Fruitier), Glenn Robbins (Uncle Arthur), Mary-Anne Fahey (Kylie Mole), Ian McFayden, Kim Gyngell (Col'n Carpenter), Chris Keogh, Russell Gilbert, Siobhan Tuke, Paula Gardener and Peter Rowsthorn debuts on Channel Ten (1988–1990).
7 March – The ABC begins airing their only Rankin/Bass animated series, The Comic Strip.
12 March – Nine Network broadcasts its Australian premiere of the American police procedural television series 21 Jump Street.
20 March – The Nine Network takes over the Rugby league rights from Network Ten, which they continue to broadcast to the present day.
26 March – In Neighbours, Daphne Clarke becomes the first character in history to die to do so after being in a coma in a car crash four months earlier.
28 March – The ABC's current affairs program Four Corners presents a television special called Wither the ABC? which was a debate over the future direction of the national broadcaster. Hosted by Andrew Olle there will be interviews with ABC managing director David Hill, Gareth Evans, Max Walsh, Terry Hayes, Peter Luck and Ted Thomas.
28 March – Blah Blah Blah a new Australian comedy series premieres on Australian Broadcasting Corporation at 9:50pm and at 10:45pm. It was hosted by Andrew Denton which also marked his very first hosting role.
18 April – The ABC launches an afternoon block for younger children at 4:30pm called Stop at this Station. This block will include animated television series from overseas such as Alias the Jester and the live-action series Tales from Fat Tulip's Garden. 
25 April – The 10:30pm timeslot becomes an unlikely battle ground as Graham Kennedy returns to the Nine Network after a 13 years absence to co-host Graham Kennedy's News Show (re-titled Graham Kennedy's Coast to Coast when the show returns for 1989) up against Seven Network's Newsworld with Clive Robertson and Network Ten's Late Night Australia with Don Lane.
29 April – QSTV (now Seven Central) starts broadcasting to remote Eastern Australia via satellite.
20 May – Perth's third commercial television station NEW-10 opens, giving Perth the same number of stations as the eastern states.
18 May – In Neighbours, Madge Mitchell and Harold Bishop marry.
20 June – ABC debuts a new children's sketch TV series called Swap Shop (based on the British Saturday Morning children's programme of the same name) at 4:30pm.
June – After six months of middling ratings, Ten Network cancels struggling soap opera, Richmond Hill, with production ending later in the year. Coincidentally, the new serial had just been purchased by the ITV network for broadcast in the United Kingdom.
17 July – In Neighbours, this was Charlene Robinson's final episode. Kylie Minogue leaves the show to focus on her recently launched recording career.
10 September – Brisbane's TVQ-0 becomes TVQ-10. On the same day, Toowoomba's DDQ-10 became DDQ-0.
October – Lee Lin Chin defects from ABC Local Radio and moves to SBS Television.
3 October – Long running Australian soap opera Home and Away starts airing on Network 2 (originally RTÉ2) in Ireland.
5 October – Ten Network's soap opera, Richmond Hill, launches on the ITV network in Britain. Originally intended to air early evening across the country, it's cancellation in Australia leads to it airing in a graveyard mid-afternoon slot and it makes no impact whatsoever.
24-25 October – In Neighbours, Mrs. Mangel marries Englishman John Worthington, immigrate to the UK and lived happily ever after. 
31 October – The British long running science fiction series Doctor Who returns to the ABC with the very first serial of Season 24 Time and the Rani, which marked the first episode to star Sylvester McCoy as the Doctor. Because the show is no longer airing at an early evening timeslot, it now airs as part of the hit weekday afternoon magazine series The Afternoon Show at 5:30pm. The show will also end on 23 November with the last part of Remembrance of the Daleks to celebrate the series' 25th anniversary.
November – Australian soap opera Home and Away airs on television in Canada for the first time on the country's already newly launched cable television channel YTV.
4 November – In Neighbours, Bronwyn Davies (Rachel Friend) and Henry Ramsay (Craig McLachlan) get together.
Christopher Skase buys Perth's TVW-7 & SAS-7 from Alan Bond's Bell Group  for $130 million, meaning that all stations in the Seven Network were owned by the one company for the first time.
12 December – Final episode of Neighbours for 1988 airs on Network Ten with a Ramsay Street Christmas Party and Jane Harris proposes to Mark Granger.

Debuts

Domestic
 17 January – Home and Away (Seven Network, 1988  – present)
 18 January – A Current Affair (Nine Network)
 27 January – Richmond Hill (Network Ten, 1988 – 1989)
 29 January – Overseas and Undersold (ABC TV, 1988 – 1991)
 7 February – Compass (ABC TV, 1988 – present)
 16 February – The Comedy Company (Network Ten, 1988 – 1990)
 29 February – c/o The Bartons (ABC TV, 1988)
 27 March – Touch the Sun (ABC TV, 1988)
 28 March – Blah Blah Blah (ABC TV)
 10 April – The Dirtwater Dynasty (Network Ten, 1988)
 18 April – Stop at this Station (ABC TV, 1988 – 1990)
 19 April – Alien Years (ABC TV, 1988)
 23 April – Seven's Super Saturday (Seven Network, 1988 – 1990)
 27 April – The Last Resort (ABC TV, 1988)
 30 May – Mulligrubs (Network Ten, 1988 – 1996)
 20 June – Swap Shop (ABC TV, 1988 – 1989)
 28 June – Just for the Record (Network Ten)
 29 June – The Gerry Connolly Show (ABC TV, 1988)
 10 July – House Rules (ABC TV, 1988)
 25 July – The Oz Game (ABC TV, 1988 – 1989)
 1 September – Bush Tucker Man (ABC TV 1988 – 1990)
 Family Feud (Seven Network, 1988 – 1996)

New International Programming
 3 January –  Durrell in Russia (ABC TV)
 3 January –  Dinosaur! (Seven Network)
 4 January –  Spirit Bay (ABC TV)
 12 January –  A Pot of Gold (SBS TV)
 13 January –  Shell Game (Nine Network)
 22 January –  Our Backyard (ABC TV)
 27 January –  The Days and Nights of Molly Dodd (ABC TV)
 28 January –  Skorpion (ABC TV)
 29 January –  Who Sir? Me Sir? (ABC TV)
 1 February –  The Tracey Ullman Show (ABC TV)
 7 February –  The Tale of the Bunny Picnic (Network Ten)
 8 February –  Degrassi Junior High (ABC TV)
 9 February –  Sledge Hammer! (Network Ten)
 9 February –  Hooperman (Network Ten)
 13 February –  The Inspector's Kids (SBS TV)
 13 February –  Thomas and Senior (SBS TV)
 14 February –  Dolly (Network Ten)
 15 February –  Tour of Duty (Network Ten)
 16 February –  The Dame Edna Experience (Seven Network)
 17 February –  Bill and Bunny (ABC TV)
 18 February –  Leo & Liz in Beverly Hills (Network Ten)
 24 February –  My Two Dads (Nine Network)
 1 March –  Erebus: The Aftermath (ABC TV)
 3 March –  Jake and the Fatman (Nine Network)
 3 March –  A Very Peculiar Practice (ABC TV)
 6 March –  Noble House (Network Ten)
 7 March –  The Comic Strip (ABC TV)
 11 March –  Rude Health (Nine Network)
 12 March –  21 Jump Street (Nine Network)
 14 March –  The Story of English (SBS TV)
 14 March –  Tass is Authorized to Announce (SBS TV)
 20 March –  Sky Commanders (Seven Network)
 21 March –  The Children of Green Knowe (ABC TV)
 22 March –  Check It Out! (Network Ten)
 2 April –  Houston Knights (Nine Network)
 3 April –  Cosmos: Special Edition (Nine Network)
 8 April –  Chance in a Million (ABC TV)
 17 April –  The Lucie Arnaz Show (Network Ten)
 17 April –  An Audience with Peter Ustinov (ABC TV)
 23 April –  ALF: The Animated Series (Seven Network)
 25 April –  Dream Stuffing (ABC TV)
 25 April –  Charlie & Co. (Network Ten)
 28 April –  The Brothers McGregor (Network Ten)
 28 April –  The Duty Men (ABC TV)
 4 May –  Spear of the Nation: The Story of the African National Congress (SBS TV)
 19 May –  Unsolved Mysteries (Seven Network)
 24 May –  Alfred Hitchcock Presents (1985) (Network Ten)
 26 May –  Ever Decreasing Circles (Seven Network)
 9 June –  Out of This World (Network Ten)
 12 June –  The Day the Universe Changed (SBS TV)
 13 June –  Brush Strokes (ABC TV)
 15 June –  Downtown (Nine Network)
 16 June –  A Perfect Spy (ABC TV)
 22 June –  Mann's Best Friends (Seven Network)
 24 June – / Captain Power and the Soldiers of the Future (Nine Network)
 27 June –  Starman (Network Ten)
 28 June –  Gnostics (SBS TV)
 30 June –  Brothers (Seven Network)
 4 July –  AfterMASH (Network Ten)
 4 July –  Spartakus and the Sun Beneath the Sea (ABC TV)
 5 July –  Half Nelson (Network Ten)
 6 July –  The Telebugs (ABC TV)
 7 July –  Hot House People (ABC TV)
 10 July –  Foofur (Seven Network)
 11 July –  The Comedians (Network Ten)
 15 July –  Fortunes of War (ABC TV)
 16 July –  Werewolf (Nine Network)
 18 July –  Frank's Place (Nine Network)
 20 July –  The Disappearance of John Avlakiotis (SBS TV)
 20 July –  Powerhouse (ABC TV)
 22 July –  Tales from the Lower Town (SBS TV)
 23 July –  The Taste of Health (SBS TV)
 1 August –  Beauty and the Beast (1987) (Seven Network)
 6 August –  Popeye and Son (Seven Network)
 8 August –  The New Adventures of Beans Baxter (ABC TV)
 8 August –  Don't Miss Wax (ABC TV)
 8 August –  Worlds Beyond (ABC TV)
 11 August –  Me and Mom (Nine Network)
 15 August –  Fresno (Nine Network)
 23 August –  Joy and Shadows (SBS TV)
 23 August –  Floodtide (ABC TV)
 24 August –  Dead Entry (ABC TV)
 24 August –  AIDS Now (SBS TV)
 28 August –  The Fear (ABC TV)
 30 August –  Blackadder II (Seven Network)
 5 September – / Worzel Gummidge Down Under (ABC TV)
 19 September –  The Japan Project (SBS TV)
 23 September –  The New Statesman (Seven Network)
 24 September –  BraveStarr (Nine Network)
 24 September –  Mighty Mouse: The New Adventures (Nine Network)
 24 September – / Dinosaucers (Nine Network)
 1 October – / Bionic Six (Network Ten)
 1 October – / The Adventures of Teddy Ruxpin (Network Ten)
 2 October –  Maharajas (ABC TV)
 4 October –  Sable (Network Ten)
 7 October –  Buddy (ABC TV)
 9 October – / The Rainbow Warrior Conspiracy (Seven Network)
 10 October –  Alice in Wonderland (1985) (Nine Network)
 18 October –  One More Audience with Dame Edna Everage (Seven Network)
 28 October –  The Haunting of Barney Palmer (ABC TV)
 5 November –  Hot Shots (Seven Network)
 8 November –  Down and Out in Beverly Hills (Seven Network)
 9 November –  Tumbledown (ABC TV)
 13 November –  Mickey's 60th Birthday (Seven Network)
 15 November –  Crazy Like a Fox (Network Ten)
 20 November –  I Married Dora (Network Ten)
 21 November –  Steel Riders (Network Ten)
 22 November –  Hannay (ABC TV)
 23 November –  Outlaws (Nine Network)
 24 November –  Prospects (ABC TV)
 24 November –  J.J. Starbuck (Nine Network)
 24 November –  Women in Prison (Nine Network)
 28 November –  Your Mother Wouldn't Like It (ABC TV)
 28 November –  The Highwayman (Network Ten)
 29 November –  The Slap Maxwell Story (Seven Network)
 1 December –  The Law & Harry McGraw (Network Ten)
 1 December –  King and Castle (ABC TV)
 3 December –  The Old Men at the Zoo (ABC TV)
 3 December – ///// Quo Vadis? (ABC TV)
 4 December – /// Race for the Bomb (ABC TV)
 5 December –  C.A.B. (Network Ten)
 5 December –  The New Gidget (Network Ten)
 16 December –  The Body Electric (ABC TV)
 19 December –  The Ghosts of Motley Hall (ABC TV)
 21 December –  Jack and Mike (Network Ten)
 24 December –  Christmas Everyday (ABC TV)
 25 December – / Fox Tales (ABC TV)
 26 December –  The December Rose (ABC TV)
 30 December –  Clarence (ABC TV)
 31 December – // Treasure Island in Outer Space (ABC TV)
  Creepy Crawlies (SBS TV)
  Playbox (Nine Network)
  Pursuit of Happiness (Unknown)

Changes to network affiliation
This is a list of programs which made their premiere on an Australian television network that had previously premiered on another Australian television network. The networks involved in the switch of allegiances are predominantly both free-to-air networks or both subscription television networks. Programs that have their free-to-air/subscription television premiere, after previously premiering on the opposite platform (free-to air to subscription/subscription to free-to air) are not included. In some cases, programs may still air on the original television network. This occurs predominantly with programs shared between subscription television networks.

International

Television shows

1950s
 Mr. Squiggle and Friends (1959–1999)

1960s
 Four Corners (1961–present)

1970s
 Hey Hey It's Saturday (1971–1999, 2009–2010)
 Young Talent Time (1971–1988)
 60 Minutes (1979–present)

1980s
 Sale of the Century (1980–2001)
 Wheel of Fortune (1981–1996, 1996–2003, 2004–present)
 Sunday (1981–2008)
 Today (1982–present)
 Neighbours (1985–present)
 The Flying Doctors (1986–1993)
 Rage (1987–present)
 Home and Away (1988–present)
 The Comedy Company (1988–1990)
 Seven's Super Saturday'' (1988–1990)

Ending this year

See also
 1988 in Australia
 List of Australian films of 1988

References